Stone's Justices' Manual is a book published by LexisNexis Butterworths. It is "the standard work on summary procedure". It displaced Burn's Justices of the Peace as the standard work on that subject from 1850 onwards. By 1914, it was old, well-established and formidably large.

Stone's Justices' Manual is published in June of every year, with an updating supplement published in October. An accompanying CD-ROM contains the full text plus additional resources such as the All England Law Reports. 

Stone's Justices' Manual covers civil procedure, criminal law and litigation and provides comprehensive coverage of all new and amended legislation affecting the magistrates' courts. It also includes hundreds of new cases that set precedents or clarify particular principles of law.

Editions

References
Marke, Julius J. A Catalogue of the Collection at New York University. New York University. 1953. Reprinted by the Lawbook Exchange Ltd. Page 199. (Google Books).
Peter Hungerford-Welch. Criminal Litigation & Sentencing. Sixth Edition. Routledge. 2004. Page 753. Digitized copy from Google Books.
"Reviews and Notices" (1902) 18 Law Quarterly Review 224
Stone's Justices' Manual: Being the Yearly Justices' Practice for 1944. 76th Edition. Butterworth & Co. 1944. Google Books.
Stone's Justices Manual 2013. Lexis Nexis Butterworths.
(2005) 155 New Law Journal 89 Google Books
"Books Reviewed" (1932) 66 Irish Law Times and Solicitors Journal 113 
"Reviews", The New Irish Jurist and Local Government Review, 10 April 1903, p 160  
"Law Library" (1963) 234 Law Times 329 Google Books
"Law Library" (1915) 138 Law Times 566 (24 April 1915)
(1968) 132 Justice of the Peace and Local Government Review 329 Google Books
(1920) 84 Justice of the Peace and Local Government Review 162 Google Books
(1917) 39 Law Students Journal 79 Google Books
(1965) 115 Law Journal 470 Google Books
(1984) 128 Solicitors Journal 16 Google Books
(1932) 76 Solicitors Journal 343 Google Books
(1887) 31 Solicitors Journal 623 Google Books

Law books